Adlisberg, with an elevation of , is a wooded mountain in Switzerland overlooking Zürichsee (Lake Zürich) to the northwest near the Zürichberg.

Geography 
Adlisberg mountain is located to the east of the city of Zürich, between the Glatt river valley and Lake Zürich. The mountain range is part of a chain of hills — among them Käferberg, Forch and Pfannenstiel — between Greifensee (Lake Greifen) and Lake Zürich.

On the southern and western flanks of the Adlisberg  are located the Zürich quarters Hottingen, Hirslanden and Witikon. The upper part of Hottingen is called Dolder and is a residential quarter of Zürich. On a terrace on the north side of the city of Zürich are situated the hamlets Tobelhof, Gockhausen and Geeren; the latter villages of the city of Dübendorf.

Points of interest 
It is a picturesque location and the lower western side of the hill is now part of the residential district of Zürich. The Zürich Zoo and FIFA's headquarters are located to the northwest, on the plateau between Adlisberg and the Zürichberg respectively the latter one on the southern flank of the Zürichberg. It is also the location of restaurants, hotels, among them the high-levelled Grand Hotel Dolder. At the Grand Hotel Dolder, a small golf course was built. Nearby, on the hilltop, sport courts are situated, among them a popular wave pool (Wellenbad Dolder), a mini-golf course, a Curling hall, tennis clubs, a driving range, and the Dolder ice rink, built in 1930 and considered to be one of the largest artificial ice rinks in Europe. Waldschule Adlisberg aims at children, provided by the city of Zürich.

The upper part of the hill is mostly woodland and a popular recreational area for hiker and biker enthusiasts. On the northeastern side of the Adlisberg the ruins of the Dübelstein castle are situated; from 1487 to 1489 the home of Hans Waldmann, former mayor of the city of Zürich.

Transportation 
The Dolderbahn rack railway runs up to the hilltop, and buses provided by the Verkehrsbetriebe Zürich (VBZ) run between Zürich and the neighbouring communities of Dübendorf, Fällanden and Maur, as well as the Tobelhofstrasse connecting the southeastern parts of Zürich with Glatt Valley and Pfannenstiel region.

Waldstadt 
In addition to 30,000 relatively inexpensive housing, 230 classrooms, 10 double gyms, swimming pools, shops, cinemas, churches, a hospital, hotels, a convention center and theater, as well as a subway and underground motorway connections were planned. Thus a completely car-free settlement on the surface would have occurred, but the project was opposed, mainly for ecological reasons, and never realized.

Gallery

References

External links 

 
 Adlisberg on hikr.org 

Geography of Zürich
Mountains of the canton of Zürich
Mountains of Switzerland
Mountains of Switzerland under 1000 metres